The Flight Attendant is a novel by Chris Bohjalian, published on March 13, 2018 by Doubleday Books. It was adapted into a television series that premiered in 2020.

Plot summary 
Flight attendant Cassandra Bowden wakes up with a hangover in a hotel room in Dubai to find a dead body next to her. Afraid to call the police, she continues as though nothing has happened, joining the other flight attendants and pilots traveling to the airport for a flight to New York City. She is met in New York by FBI agents who question her about her recent layover in Dubai. Still unable to piece the night together, she starts to wonder whether she could be the killer.

Reception 
The Flight Attendant was well-received by critics with a "Positive" rating from the book review aggregator Book Marks based on seven independent reviews. Writing for The Washington Post, Maureen Corrigan described the novel as, "the ultimate airplane book, and not just because of its name: entertaining and filled with inside info on the less glamorous aspect of flight crew’s lives, it may even make you more politely attentive the next time you’re asked to listen to that in-flight lecture on emergency water landings."

Television adaptation 

In October 2017, it was announced that Kaley Cuoco's production company, Yes, Norman Productions, had optioned the rights to the book to be developed into a limited television series with the same name, The Flight Attendant, starring Cuoco, who was also an executive producer.

The series premiered on November 26, 2020 on HBO Max.

References

2018 American novels
American mystery novels
American novels adapted into television shows
Works about flight attendants
Novels about alcoholism
Aviation novels
Doubleday (publisher) books